Polikalepo Kolivai (born ~1939) was crowned as sau (translated by the French as "king") of Sigave in July 2010. His appointment was not recognised by other clans, and he was recognised by only a few villages before retiring. When Eufenio Takala was crowned in 2016 the throne was said to have been vacant for seven years.

See also
List of kings of Sigave
Monarchies in Oceania

References

Wallis and Futuna monarchs
Living people
1930s births
Year of birth uncertain
Place of birth missing (living people)